Markham is a city and a south suburb of Chicago in Cook County, Illinois, United States. The population was 11,661 at the 2020 census.

Geography
Markham is located at  (41.597467, -87.691570).

History 

It is claimed this area was beach 10,000 years ago. After countless ages of geologic swamps, marshes and sloughs, the prairies dominated the landscape with groves of trees, flowers, and wildlife in abundance.

Markham, southwest of the southern tip of Lake Michigan, had been a crossroad for early pioneers. In 1816 a treaty was made with the Ottawa, Chippewa and Potawatomi tribes which ceded a corridor of land located between a point north of the Chicago River and the mouth of the Calumet River to the settlers. The southern boundary, one of two Indian Treaty Boundary Lines, was surveyed along a line from the Kankakee River to Lake Michigan.  The line still appears on government maps and now includes a short portion of Interstate 57 near the US 6 interchange northwest of Markham.

The village of Markham was incorporated in 1925 with a population under 300. The village was named for Charles H. Markham, president of the Illinois Central Railroad 1911–1918, 1919–1926. In the mid-1930s, the Croissant Park subdivision was built and increased the population from 349 to 1,388. After World War II, Markham's population doubled to 2,753 residents by 1950. The village developed into a bedroom community as residents sought homes, not industry. An airport developed at 165th Street and Kedzie Avenue was the nearest field outside of Chicago. The airport site was located near what is now the Cook County Sixth Circuit Courthouse. On August 24, 1967, Markham was incorporated as a city.

In 2017, Roger Agpawa was elected mayor.  He had previously served as fire chief in neighboring Country Club Hills.  Having been convicted in 1999 of felony mail fraud in a federal health insurance case, he is one of the first convicted felons to have been elected mayor.  Experts state that he would have been ineligible to serve in the highest office in that city, despite being sworn in as mayor in October 2018 after an 18-month legal battle.

The Lone Pine Tree 
In 1860, a German immigrant named Lawrence Roesner made his way to the southern boundary and settled on land located in the northwest corner of Markham. He brought with him six seedlings from the Black Forest of Germany and planted them along the Indian Boundary Line. This "Lone Pine Tree" was adopted as the official city symbol in 1985. The lone survivor of six pine trees brought from the Black Forest in 1860 died in 1986. The Markham City Council appropriated money to get a replacement tree from the Black Forest, which the Markham Garden Club planted that year.

Demographics

As of the 2020 census there were 11,661 people, 3,832 households, and 2,821 families residing in the city. The racial makeup of the city was 72.93% African American, 8.88% White, 0.91% Asian, 0.39% Native American, 10.26% from other races, and 6.64% from two or more races. Hispanic or Latino of any race were 17.27% of the population.

There were 3,832 households, out of which 73.36% had children under the age of 18 living with them, 28.42% were married couples living together, 37.42% had a female householder with no husband present, and 26.38% were non-families. 23.12% of all households were made up of individuals, and 10.15% had someone living alone who was 65 years of age or older. The average household size was 3.84 and the average family size was 3.23.

The city's age distribution consisted of 31.2% under the age of 18, 9.5% from 18 to 24, 24.3% from 25 to 44, 21.4% from 45 to 64, and 13.8% who were 65 years of age or older. The median age was 32.0 years. For every 100 females, there were 87.3 males. For every 100 females age 18 and over, there were 73.8 males.

The median income for a household in the city was $42,050, and the median income for a family was $45,880. Males had a median income of $28,214 versus $29,815 for females. The per capita income for the city was $19,580. About 17.4% of families and 20.9% of the population were below the poverty line, including 37.6% of those under age 18 and 14.8% of those age 65 or over.

Note: the US Census treats Hispanic/Latino as an ethnic category. This table excludes Latinos from the racial categories and assigns them to a separate category. Hispanics/Latinos can be of any race.

Government
Markham is divided between two congressional districts. Most of the city is in Illinois's 2nd congressional district, consisting of the area south of the Dan Ryan Expressway (I-57) that is bordered on the west by Homan Avenue from 155th to 161st streets, Trumbull Avenue from 161st to 163rd, and Lawndale Avenue from 163rd to 167th; the rest of the city is part of the 1st district.

1st Congressional District-Congressman Bobby Rush-Democrat
2nd Congressional District-Congressman Robin Kelly-Democrat

In the Illinois State Senate Markham is split by two districts:
15th District-Senator Napoleon B. Harris III-Democrat
19th District-Senator Michael Hastings-Democrat

In the Illinois House of Representatives Markham is split by two districts:
30th District-Representative William Davis-Democrat
38th District-Representative Debbie Meyers-Martin-Democrat

Police department
The Markam Police Department is responsible for public safety and law enforcement.

Anthony "Tony" DeBois, the deputy police chief from 2008 to 2012 and described as an "ally of Markham Mayor David Webb Jr." by the Chicago Tribune, had been the subject to numerous lawsuits alleging brutality and misconduct from 2004 to 2011.  In 2014 he was sentenced to 5 years in federal prison for raping a woman under arrest in 2010 and lying about it to the FBI in 2012.

Indian Boundary Prairies
There are four prairies known as "Dropseed", "Sundrop", "Paintbrush" and "Gensburg". The prairie is under the supervision of Northeastern Illinois University and The Nature Conservancy. The Gensburg-Markham Prairie portion has been designated a National Natural Landmark. The prairies continue to grow and flourish with the help of the Friends of the Indian Boundary Prairies.

Education
A portion of Markham is within the Posen-Robbins School District 143½.

Most of Markham is served by Bremen High School, with the small remaining section going to Tinley Park High School in Bremen Community High School District 228

Notable people

 Randy Daniels, raised in Markham, secretary of state in New York, deputy mayor of New York City
 Floyd Fields, raised in Markham, retired safety for San Diego Chargers
 Cliff Floyd, raised in Markham, outfielder for San Diego Padres
 Rodney Harrison, native of Markham, retired safety for New England Patriots and  San Diego Chargers
 Curtis Mayfield, solo artist and member of soul group the Impressions, once lived in Markham
 Denny McLain, Major League Baseball player and Cy Young Award-winning pitcher
 Corey McPherrin, raised in Markham, news anchor and former sportscaster for WFLD-TV.
 Kid Sister, hip-hop artist, raised in Markham, "First Lady of Markham"
 Christopher "Tricky" Stewart, hip-hop artist and producer, born in Markham

References

External links

City of Markham official website
Markham Library

 
Cities in Illinois
Cities in Cook County, Illinois
Populated places established in 1925
1925 establishments in Illinois
Majority-minority cities and towns in Cook County, Illinois